The lemon-bellied crombec (Sylvietta denti) is a species of African warbler, formerly placed in the family Sylviidae.
It is sparsely present throughout the African tropical rainforest.
Its natural habitats are subtropical or tropical moist lowland forests and subtropical or tropical moist shrubland.

References

lemon-bellied crombec
Birds of the African tropical rainforest
lemon-bellied crombec
Taxonomy articles created by Polbot